The 1947 All-Ireland Senior Football Championship was the 61st staging of Ireland's premier Gaelic football knock-out competition.

The Munster final between Cork & Kerry became a start of common Cork-Kerry Munster finals until 1990 expect 4.

Cavan were the winners. All Ireland final in New York ending Kerry's All Ireland title.

Results

Connacht Senior Football Championship

Leinster Senior Football Championship

Munster Senior Football Championship

Ulster Senior Football Championship

All-Ireland Senior Football Championship

Championship statistics

Miscellaneous

 The Dungannon Fields are named O'Neill Park after Hugh O'Neill.
 The All Ireland final, Cavan vs Kerry was played in New York City, in the United States of America, the last time played outside Croke Park, Dublin and only played outside Ireland.
 Kerry goalkeeper Dan O'Keeffe is the first Gaelic Football player attempting to win a record-breaking 8th All-Ireland winners medal on the field of play, only to have lost to Cavan in the championship final.

References